The Women of Pitcairn Island is a 1956 American adventure drama film directed by Jean Yarbrough and starring Lynn Bari, John Smith and Sue England.

The film's sets were designed by the art director Dave Milton.

Plot
Nearly twenty years after the Bounty mutineers landed on Pitcairn Island, the last survivor has died leaving only their local-born widows and children. Tensions arise on the island when a fresh load of shipwrecked sailors arrive.

Cast
 James Craig as Capt. Jeb Page 
 Lynn Bari as Queen Maimiti Christian  
 John Smith as Thursday October Christian
 Sue England as Nana'i Young  
 Arleen Whelan as Hutia   
 Harry Lauter as Ben Fish  
 Henry Rowland as Muskie  
 Pierce Lyden as Dan Scruggs  
 Paul Sorensen as Sam Allard  
 Rico Alaniz as The Spanisher  
 John Stevens as Charles Quintal, island boy 
 Tim Johnson as John Martin  
 Carol Thurston as Balhadi  
 Sonia Sorel as Taharua Young  
 Lorna Thayer as Moa'tua, weeping woman  
 Michael Miller as Tom, captive boy  
 Richard Devin as Niahiti, captive boy  
 House Peters Jr. as Coggins, sailor hiding jewels  
 Carol Richards as Title Theme Singer (voice)  
 Charlita as Island Woman  
 Milicent Patrick as Island Woman  
 Roxanne Reed as Island Woman  
 Joel Collins as Island Boy  
 James Westmoreland as Island Boy  
 Robert Cabal as Island Boy  
 Robert Kendall as Island Boy

Production
Filming started in August 1956 in Paramount's Sunset Studios.

See also
List of American films of 1956

References

Bibliography
 Ray Hagen & Laura Wagner. Killer Tomatoes: Fifteen Tough Film Dames. McFarland, 2014.

External links
 
The Women of Pitcairn Island at BFI

1956 films
1950s adventure drama films
1950s historical adventure films
1950s English-language films
American adventure drama films
Films directed by Jean Yarbrough
American historical adventure films
20th Century Fox films
Films set in the 1800s
Seafaring films
Films about HMS Bounty
Films scored by Paul Dunlap
1956 drama films
Films produced by Aubrey Wisberg
Films with screenplays by Aubrey Wisberg
1950s American films
American black-and-white films